A Bye-Fellow is a position in academia and post-secondary education at several British and Commonwealth universities for a Fellow who is not a member of the foundation of a college, or "may or may not have fewer privileges when compared to a full fellow".

See also
 List of academic ranks
 Academic ranks in the United Kingdom

References

Academic administration
Academic ranks
Education and training occupations